The Chenrezig Tibetan Buddhist Center of Philadelphia (CTBC) is a Tibetan Buddhist temple located in Philadelphia, Pennsylvania.
The center was founded in 1991 by Geshe Losang Samten, a sand mandala artist who served as an attendant to the 14th Dalai Lama.

External links
Homepage

References

Asian-American culture in Pennsylvania
Tibetan Buddhism in the United States
Tibetan Buddhist temples
Buddhist temples in Pennsylvania